The Yakima Valley Libraries (YVL) is a public, 17-branch library system located in the Yakima Valley region of Washington, United States. The library system's collection includes public access to books, CDs, audiobooks, DVDs, and other materials, in both Spanish and English.

History
The Yakima Public Library was constructed in 1904, primarily using $10,000 grant donated for that purpose by Andrew Carnegie. The Rural Library District #1 (RLD) was established in 1944, and, in 1951, pooled resources with the City of Yakima to form the Yakima Valley Regional Library System. Over the next decade, the rural cities of Zillah, Union Gap, Granger, Naches, Mabton, unincorporated Buena, joined the burgeoning library system. The cities of Sunnyside and joined the Regional Library in the 1950s. The 1970s saw the addition of Tieton, Harrah and Zillah, as well as the establishment of the Summitview (Yakima) branch. Moxee and Harrah joined in the 1980s, followed by the City of Toppenish, and the establishment of the Southeast (Yakima) branch in the 1990s, completing the current 17-branch system.

Library mission
The Yakima Valley Libraries Mission Statement, adopted August 24, 1999, states:

Organization
Many of the library branches are small and offer somewhat limited services to small, rural communities. The largest branches of the YVL system are West Valley, Selah, Sunnyside and the Downtown branch. The Downtown library is the largest, busiest branch, and, according to the YVL website, "also houses the library system's service center which includes programing for all ages, outreach services, technical services, information technology, and administration."

The Library is headed by the five-member Board of Library Trustees, who are appointed by the Yakima County Commissioners. The board is in charge of appointing the library director, who administers and adheres to the policies laid down by the board. In addition, the library is supported by Friends of the Library, who help coordinate donations and grants for the library, as well as furthering the role of libraries in the public, and raising funds for projects that are not covered in the library budget.

Branches

The Yakima Valley Libraries system has branches in Granger, Harrah, Mabton, Moxee, Naches, Selah, Southeast Yakima, Sunnyside, Terrace Heights, Tieton, Toppenish, Wapato, West Valley, White Swan, Downtown Yakima, and Zillah.

References

External links
 

Carnegie libraries in Washington (state)
County library systems in Washington (state)
Education in Yakima County, Washington